Van Voorhis may refer to:

Places
Van Voorhis, Pennsylvania, a census-designated place in Washington County
Van Voorhis, West Virginia, an unincorporated community in Monongalia County

People
Bruce Van Voorhis
H. Clay Van Voorhis
Daniel Van Voorhis — son
John Van Voorhis
John Van Voorhis (judge) — grandson, through son Eugene.
Westbrook Van Voorhis

Other